Ainoa is a genus of lichens in the family Baeomycetaceae. The genus contains two species: A. mooreana, and the type,  A. geochroa. The genus was circumscribed in 2001 by H. Thorsten Lumbsch and Imke Schmitt to contain the two species, which were formerly placed in genus Trapelia. A third species,  Ainoa bella from eastern North America, was added to the genus in 2015.

The genus name of Ainoa is in honour of Aino Marjatta Henssen (1925–2011), who was a German lichenologist and systematist.

References

Baeomycetales
Baeomycetales genera
Lichen genera
Taxa described in 2001
Taxa named by Helge Thorsten Lumbsch